Zeno von Singalewicz (born 14 August 1875, date of death unknown) was an Austrian swimmer. He competed in the men's 400 metre breaststroke event at the 1912 Summer Olympics.

References

External links
 

1875 births
Year of death missing
Olympic swimmers of Austria
Swimmers at the 1912 Summer Olympics
Swimmers from Vienna
Austrian male breaststroke swimmers